Erin Bode is an American singer from Minnesota who describes her music as a combination of jazz, folk, and pop.

Biography
In the decade-plus since Erin Bode began her professional recording career, she has garnered much critical praise for her pure voice and impressive phrasing and style. It is this talent, coupled with her reluctance to accept classification as a purely jazz vocalist that has led to reviews hailing her as “someone you won’t forget” and comparing her sound to the likes of Eva Cassidy and Norah Jones.

A Minnesota native, Bode was first introduced to music by her parents, who emphasized music in daily life and encouraged her to join the church choir. She studied music as well as foreign languages at the University of Minnesota in the Twin Cities and graduated from Webster University in St. Louis. It is at Webster where Erin studied vocal jazz with Christine Hitt who helped to launch her career as a vocalist.

Shortly after graduating college, Bode produced her first record, Requests. The album was successful in gaining Bode local attention and secured her a recording contract with jazz label, Maxjazz. Bode gained exposure through appearances on various national broadcasts including CBS’s Second Cup Café and Garrison Keillor’s A Prairie Home Companion.

To date, Bode and her band have released eight albums and have toured the United States, as well as Italy, Asia, and Africa. The Erin Bode Group creates music forged from the Americana of its members’ Midwestern roots, infused with jazz grooves and made magic by Bode’s bell-like voice. Sophisticated arrangements and attention to phrasing, both vocal and instrumental, further distinguish the band’s fresh sound.

Bode’s recorded works run the gamut between standard jazz and decidedly more pop-based pieces. 2008’s Little Garden and 2010’s Photograph feature all original material by Bode, and showcase her love of poetry with songs that are rich in harmonic and timbral texture.

Erin’s latest project, YourSong is a collaboration between her listeners and herself in which she curates personalized compositions for any occasion or inspiration.  These songs are given as gifts, kept as keepsakes and have become some of the most rewarding experiences of Erin’s life and career.  A collection of some of these first projects and the stories behind them can be heard on Erin’s new album, YourSong, Volume 1.

Discography 
 Don't Take Your Time (Maxjazz, 2004)
 Over and Over (Maxjazz, 2006)
 The Little Garden (Native Language, 2008)
 A Cold December Night (Native Language, 2008)
 Photograph (Canyon, 2010)
 Be Still My Soul (2013)
 Here and Now (2016)
 YourSong, Volume 1 (2021)

References

External links
 Official site

Living people
People from Wayzata, Minnesota
Singers from Missouri
Musicians from St. Louis
Webster University alumni
American Lutherans
American jazz singers
American women jazz singers
Year of birth missing (living people)
Jazz musicians from Minnesota
Jazz musicians from Missouri
Native Language Music artists
Mack Avenue Records artists
21st-century American women